Preservative against Popery (also Preservation against Popery) is a name commonly given to a collection of anti-Catholic works published in 1738 by Edmund Gibson. It drew largely on the literature of the "Romish Controversy" of the 1680s, in which Church of England controversialists made a case against what they saw as a present threat from Catholicism. The original edition was in three folio volumes.

19th-century edition (1848–49)
John Cumming made an edition in the 1840s. In 18 volumes, it collected up extra tracts. The publication was supported by the British Reformation Society, part of the reaction to Tractarianism.

Supplement (1849–50)
Cumming, Richard Paul Blakeney and Martin Wilson Foye then edited a Supplement to the edition of Cumming, again for the British Reformation Society. It was in eight volumes.

Isaac Barrow, The Pope's Supremacy'
Simon Birckbek, The Protestant's Evidence (2 vols.)
Humphrey Lynde, Via Tuta and Via DeviaLynde, A Case for the Spectacles, and Daniel Featley, Stricturæ in LyndomastigemJohn Edwards, The Doctrines Controverted between Papists and ProtestantsFoye, Rites, Offices and LegendsJames Serces, Popery Enemy to Scripture (1736; a reply to Robert Witham, Annotations on the New Testament of Jesus Christ, 1730), Pierre Mussard, The Religious Rites of Ancient and Modern Rome, Barrow, A Discourse Concerning the Unity of the ChurchRelated titles
 William Sherlock (1688), A Preservative Against Popery Edward Aspinwall (1715) A Preservation Against PoperyJohn Hildrop (1735), A Caveat against Popery; being a seasonable Preservative against Romish Delusions and Jacobitism now industriously spread throughout the NationJoseph Blanco White (1825), The Poor Man's Preservative Against Popery''

References

1738 books
1848 books
1849 books
Anti-Catholic publications
History of the Church of England
Religious books